The qabin is the Mandaean wedding ritual. Mandaean weddings are typically held for several days. Traditionally, weddings must be officiated by a Mandaean priest and can only be performed for ethnic Mandaeans, although this has proved to be challenging for the contemporary Mandaean diaspora.

During the qabin wedding ceremony, a Mandaean priest reads prayers from The Wedding of the Great Šišlam. Zidqa brika, which includes hamra and various dried fruits and nuts, is also offered and consumed.

Drower (1937: 59–71) contains a detailed account of a traditional Mandaean village wedding.

A wedding chamber or canopy used during Mandaean wedding ceremonies is called an andiruna, a term which is also used to refer to temporary reed huts used during priest initiation ceremonies.

See also
Jewish wedding
Islamic marital practices

References

External links
Mandaean weddings in Stockholm
Qabeen (Marriage): the marriage of Fazel Atta and Rim Talib, preceded by baptism

Mandaeism
Weddings by religion
Mandaic words and phrases
Iranian words and phrases